Elizabeth Anne Webby  (1942– ) is a literary critic, editor and scholar in the field of literature. Emeritus Professor Webby retired from the Chair of Australian Literature at the University of Sydney in 2007. She edited The Cambridge Companion to Australian Literature (Melbourne, 2000) and was editor of Southerly from 1988 to 1999.

Personal life and education
Webby was born Elizabeth Anne Loder in Sydney in 1942 to George Loder and his wife Betty Ellis. She completed her secondary education at Presbyterian Ladies' College, Sydney and then attended the University of Sydney. She married Barry Webby in 1966.

Career

Webby was first employed as a tutor in English Literature at the University of Sydney in 1965. Her academic career progressed at that University and she became Professor of Australian Literature in 1990. Upon retirement in 2007, she became Emeritus Professor of Australian Literature. In recognition of her retirement, The University of Queensland Press and Australian Literary Studies jointly published New Reckonings : Australian literature past, present, future : Essays in honour of Elizabeth Webby, edited by Leigh Dale and Brigid Rooney, in 2007.

From 1988 to 1999 Webby was the editor of Southerly. She has had two terms as chair of the judging panel for the Nita B Kibble Literary Awards for Australian women's life writing, in 1992–96 and 2005–07. In 1999–2004 she was a judge for the Miles Franklin Award.

Webby donated her 1974–2002 papers, including correspondence, research and material relating to Southerly to the State Library of New South Wales on her retirement in June 2007.

Selected bibliography

As author
 Modern Australian Plays, Sydney University Press, Melbourne, 1990,

As editor
 Early Australian Poetry : An annotated bibliography of original poems published in Australian newspapers, magazines & almanacks before 1850, Hale & Ironmonger, Sydney, 1982, 
 Happy Endings : Stories by Australian and New Zealand women, 1850s–1930s, co-editor with Lydia Wevers, Allen & Unwin, North Sydney, 1987, 
 Colonial Voices : Letters, diaries, journalism and other accounts of nineteenth-century Australia, University of Queensland Press, 1989, 
 Memory, co-editor with Ivor Indyk, Collins/Angus & Robertson, Pymble, 1991,  
 Poetry, co-editor with Ivor Indyk, Collins/Angus & Robertson, Pymble, 1992,  
 Reconnoitres : Essays in Australian literature in honour of G.A. Wilkes, co-editor with Margaret Harris, Oxford University Press in association with Sydney University Press, Melbourne, 1992, 
 Goodbye to Romance : Stories by Australian and New Zealand women, 1930s–1980s, co-editor with Lydia Wevers, Allen & Unwin, Wellington, New Zealand, 1989, 
 The Cambridge Companion to Australian Literature, Cambridge University Press, New York, 2000, 
 Walter and Mary : The letters of Walter and Mary Richardson, co-editor with Gillian Sykes, Melbourne University Press, 2000,

Awards and recognition
 Fellow of the Australian Academy of the Humanities, 1997
 Centenary Medal, 2001, "For service to Australian society and the humanities in the study of Australian literature."
 A. A. Phillips Award, presented by the Association for the Study of Australian Literature (ASAL) "For services to the teaching and research of Australian Literature."
 Member of the Order of Australia (AM), 2004 Australia Day Honours, "For service to the study, teaching and promotion of Australian literature, for support to Australian authors, and for fostering links between the academic and general reading communities."

References

External links
 

1942 births
Living people
Academic staff of the University of Sydney
Australian literary critics
Australian women literary critics
Fellows of the Australian Academy of the Humanities
Members of the Order of Australia